Charles E. Hummel (died August 2004) was president of Barrington College in Rhode Island and the director of faculty ministries at InterVarsity Christian Fellowship in Madison, Wisconsin.

Notable work 
Hummel is known for his essay, "Tyranny of the Urgent", published in 1967 as a booklet by InterVarsity Press, which became popular as guide to time management and personal productivity in both ministry and business circles, and has since undergone periodic updates and revisions. In 1997 he published "Freedom from Tyranny of the Urgent", an expansion upon his original work.

During his life Hummel authored fifteen books and Bible studies.

Selected bibliography 
 A Pure Heart: The Window to God 
 Campus Christian Witness
 Creation or Evolution?: Resolving Crucial Issues
 Doubters Welcome
 Filled with the Spirit
 Fire in the Fireplace
 Freedom from Tyranny of the Urgent
 Genesis: God's Creative Call
 Healing
 Priorities
 The Galileo Connection
 The Search: Studies for pondering the know-why of existence
 Tyranny of the Urgent

References

External links 
 InterVarsity Press - Charles E. Hummel (https://www.ivpress.com/charles-e-hummel); retrieved November 30, 2017
 LibraryThing - Bibliography (https://www.librarything.com/author/hummelcharlese); retrieved November 30, 2017

Year of birth missing
2004 deaths
Heads of universities and colleges in the United States